The Free Knowledge Foundation (FKF) is an organization aiming to promote Free Knowledge, including Free Software and Free Standards. It was founded in 2004 and is based in Madrid, Spain.

Pablo Machón has been FKF's president since 2004. In 2005, the Foundation appointed Richard Stallman as Patron of Honor.

In 2006 the FKF became an associate organization of the Free Software Foundation Europe.

Libremeeting
FKF organizes LibreMeeting, the International Free Knowledge Meeting of Madrid. It is usually held at La Cristelera Residence, in the town of Miraflores de la Sierra, 50 km. away from Madrid.

The Foundation presents the libre.org awards at LibreMeeting. These awards are honored to people or organizations that promote free knowledge. Some of the recipients are:

 Juan Carlos Rodríguez Ibarra, Extremadura's former President
 Esteban González Pons, Spanish Popular Party's politician
 The Spanish Senate
 Juan Alberto Belloch, Spanish ex-minister of Justice and Interior and Mayor of Zaragoza
 The Junta de Andalucía (Andalusian Autonomous Government)
 The Generalitat Valenciana (Valencian Autonomous Government)
 The Spanish Ministry of Industry, Tourism and Trade

Event participation and organization 

See also 
 Open Knowledge Foundation

References

External links 
Free Knowledge Foundation
Free Knowledge Foundation alternate page
Weblog of Manuel Gualda, from the FKF Team (in Spanish)

Foundations based in Spain
Open content
Access to Knowledge movement
Public domain
Organizations established in 2004